Pak Tho station is a railway station located in Pak Tho Subdistrict, Pak Tho District, Ratchaburi.

History 
At about 18:30 on 24 February 2020, a freight train and a passenger train collided head on at the station. At least 30 people were injured.

Services 
 Rapid 169/170 Bangkok-Yala-Bangkok
 Ordinary 251/252 Bang Sue Junction-Prachuap Khiri Khan-Bang Sue Junction
 Ordinary 254/255 Lang Suan-Thon Buri-Lang Suan
 Ordinary 261/262 Bangkok-Hua Hin-Bangkok

Future 

Pak Tho station (Station code: RS42)  is a planned railway station on the SRT Dark Red Line. In the future, the Maeklong Railway is planned to extend and meet the Southern Line mainline at this station, with 3 new stations between Maeklong and Pak Tho.

References 

 
 
 

Railway stations in Thailand
Ratchaburi province